This is the list of cathedrals in Hungary sorted by denomination.

Roman Catholic

Cathedrals of the Roman Catholic Church in Hungary:
 St. Anne’s Cathedral in Debrecen
 Co-Cathedral of Our Lady of the Hungarians in Nyíregyháza
 Metropolitan Cathedral Basilica of St. John the Apostle and Evangelist, St. Michael and the Immaculate Conception in Eger
 Primatial Cathedral of Our Lady and St. Adalbert Bishop and Martyr in Esztergom
 Co-Cathedral Basilica of St. Stephen the King in Budapest
 Cathedral Basilica of the Assumption of Our Lady in Győr
 Metropolitan Cathedral of the Assumption of the Blessed Virgin Mary in Kalocsa
 Co-Cathedral of the Assumption of Our Lord in Kecskemét
 Cathedral of the Blessed Virgin Mary in Kaposvár
 St. Martin Basilica (Benedictine Archabbey of Pannonhalma) in Pannonhalma
 Cathedral Basilica of Saint Peter and Paul in Pécs
 Cathedral of Our Lady of the Hungarians in Szeged
Co-Cathedral of St. Anthony in Békéscsaba
Cathedral Basilica of St. Stephen the King in Székesfehérvár
 Cathedral of the Visitation of Our Lady in Szombathely
 Cathedral of the Assumption of the Blessed Virgin and St. Michael the Archangel in Vác
 St. Michael’s Cathedral Basilica in Veszprém

Greek Catholic
 
 Cathedral of the Presentation of the Blessed Virgin Mary in the Temple in Hajdúdorog 
  Cathedral of Our Lady in Miskolc
  Szent Miklós Görögkatolikus székesegyház, in Nyíregyháza

Eastern Orthodox
Eastern Orthodox cathedrals in Hungary:
 Virgin's Cathedral ("Belgrade Cathedral") in Szentendre (Serbian Orthodox)
 Saint Nicolas Church in Gyula (Romanian Orthodox)
 Assumption Cathedral in Budapest (Russian Orthodox)
St. Mary Church in Budapest (Coptic Orthdox)

See also
Lists of cathedrals by country

References

 
Hungary
Cathedrals
Cathedrals